Daniel McConnell (born 9 August 1985) is an Australian cross-country mountain biker. McConnell qualified for the 2020 Tokyo Olympics. He finished 30th in the men's cross-country event.

Early years 
McConnell began cycling at 13 years of age. His hard work and dedication to the sport paid off and was chosen for the Australian Team in 2002. At the age of 23 McConnell made his Olympic debut at the 2008 Beijing Games. He was placed 39th in the mountain bike cross-country event.

Achievements 
At the 2012 Summer Olympics, McConnell competed in the Men's cross-country at Hadleigh Farm, finishing in 21st place.  T

At the 2014 Commonwealth Games, he won the bronze medal in the men's cross-country cycling, finishing ten seconds behind the winner.

His mother, Jenny Orr, competed at the 1972 Summer Olympics in the 800 and 1500 metres athletics.

He is married to Australian Elite mountain biker Rebecca McConnell. She also qualified for the 2020 Tokyo Olympics and finished 28th in the women’s cross-country event.

Major results

Mountain Bike

2008
 3rd  Cross-country, Oceania Championships
2009
 1st  Cross-country, Oceania Championships
2010
 1st  Cross-country, Oceania Championships
 1st  Cross-country, National Championships
2011
 1st  Short track, Oceania Championships
2012
 1st  Cross-country, Oceania Championships
 1st  Cross-country, National Championships
2013
 1st  Cross-country, Oceania Championships
 2nd Overall UCI World Cup
1st Albstadt
2014
 1st  Cross-country, Oceania Championships
 3rd  Cross-country, Commonwealth Games
 3rd Overall UCI World Cup
3rd Mont-Sainte-Anne
2015
 1st  Cross-country, Oceania Championships
 1st  Cross-country, National Championships
2016
 2nd  Cross-country, Oceania Championships
2017
 1st  Cross-country, National Championships
 3rd  Cross-country, Oceania Championships
2019
 1st  Cross-country, National Championships
2020
 1st  Cross-country, National Championships
 3rd  Cross-country, Oceania Championships
2021
 National Championships
1st  Cross-country
1st  Short track

Road
2006
 3rd Overall Tour of Gippsland
1st Stage 9
 3rd Overall Tour de Hokkaido
 8th GP Palio del Recioto

References

External links

Australian Olympic team profile
London2012.com profile 

McConnell wins at Albstadt, Germany

1985 births
Australian male cyclists
Commonwealth Games bronze medallists for Australia
Cross-country mountain bikers
Cyclists from Victoria (Australia)
Cyclists at the 2008 Summer Olympics
Cyclists at the 2012 Summer Olympics
Cyclists at the 2014 Commonwealth Games
Cyclists at the 2016 Summer Olympics
Living people
Olympic cyclists of Australia
Commonwealth Games medallists in cycling
Cyclists at the 2020 Summer Olympics
20th-century Australian people
21st-century Australian people
Medallists at the 2014 Commonwealth Games